The 2009 CPISRA Football 7-a-side International Championships was an international championship for men's national 7-a-side association football teams. CPISRA stands for Cerebral Palsy International Sports & Recreation Association. Athletes with a physical disability competed. The Championship took place in the Netherlands from 23 October to 1 November 2009.

Football 7-a-side was played with modified FIFA rules. Among the modifications were that there were seven players, no offside, a smaller playing field, and permission for one-handed throw-ins. Matches consisted of two thirty-minute halves, with a fifteen-minute half-time break. The Championships was a qualifying event for the 2011 CPISRA Football 7-a-side World Championships.

Participating teams and officials

Qualifying 
The following teams are qualified for the tournament:

The draw 
During the draw, the teams were divided into pots because of rankings. Here, the following groups:

Squads 
The individual teams contact following football gamblers on to:

Group A

Group B

Group C

Group D

Venues 
The venues to be used for the International Championships were located in Arnhem.

Format 

The first round, the first group stage, was a competition between the 12 teams divided among four groups of three, where each group engaged in a round-robin tournament within itself. The two highest ranked teams in each group advanced to the second group stage for the position one to eight. the two lower ranked teams plays for the positions nine to 32. Teams were awarded three points for a win and one for a draw. When comparing teams in a group over-all result came before head-to-head.

In the second round, the second group stage, the two groups, each with four teams, fighting for the positions one to eight, the first placed of the two groups played in the finals around the victory of the tournament, the second place around the third place, the third place around the fifth place and the last plays around the seventh place. The five last placed, one from group 1, group 3 and group 4 and two from group 2 plays everyone against everyone. The first placed is the ninth of the tournament, the second-place finishes the tenth, the third-place finishes the eleventh, the fourth place the twelfth and the fifth place the thirteenth. For any match in the finals, a draw after 60 minutes of regulation time was followed by two 10 minute periods of extra time to determine a winner. If the teams were still tied, a penalty shoot-out was held to determine a winner.

Classification
Athletes with a physical disability competed. The athlete's disability was caused by a non-progressive brain damage that affects motor control, such as cerebral palsy, traumatic brain injury or stroke. Athletes must be ambulant.

Players were classified by level of disability.
 C5: Athletes with difficulties when walking and running, but not in standing or when kicking the ball.
 C6: Athletes with control and co-ordination problems of their upper limbs, especially when running.
 C7: Athletes with hemiplegia.
 C8: Athletes with minimal disability; must meet eligibility criteria and have an impairment that has impact on the sport of football.

Teams must field at least one class C5 or C6 player at all times. No more than two players of class C8 are permitted to play at the same time.

First Group stage 
The first round, or group stage, have seen the sixteen teams divided into four groups of four teams.

Group A

Group B

Group C

Group D

Second Group stage

Group W

Group X

Group Y 
Position 9-11

Finals 
Position 7-8

Position 5-6

Position 3-4

Final

Statistics

Goalscorers 
 13 goals

  Abdolreza Karimizadeh

 8 goals

  Renato Lima
  Wanderson Silva de Oliveira
  Ivan Pothekin

 7 goals

  Bahman Ansari

 5 goals

  Anatolii Shevchyk
  Sefik Smajlovic
  John Swinkels

 4 goals

  Alexey Chesmin
  Taras Dutko
  Luke Evans
  Stanislav Kloykhalov
  Antonio Rocha

 3 goals

  Adam Ballou
  Ehsan Gholamhossein-pour Bousheri
  Claudemar Lima
  Finbar O’Riordan
  Dennis Straatman
  Andriy Tsukanov

 2 goals

  Moslem Akbari
  Volodymyr Antonyuk
  Pavel Borisov
  Mamuka Dzimistarishvili
  Jose Guimaraes
  Dustin Hodgson
  Mark Jones
  Viacheslav Larionov
  Stephan Lokhoff
  Gary Messett
  Georgy Nadzharyan
  Graeme Paterson
  Jonathan Paterson
  Denys Ponomaryov
  Vito Proietti
  Marthell Vazquez

 1 goal

  Daniel Berry
  Mateus Calvo
  Paul Dollard
  Keith Gardner
  Thomas Goodman
  Morteza Heidari
  James Jordon
  Darren Kavanagh
  Sam Larkings
  Jamie Laybutt
  Jarrod Law
  Leandro Marinho
  Laurie McGinley
  Zack Murdock
  Gholamreza Najafi
  Jamie Paulsen
  Jean Rodrigues
  Hadi Safari
  Pedro Santos Jr.
  Jean Silva
  Ivan Shkvarlo
  Jamie Tervit
  Aleksey Tumakov
  Patrick van Kempen
  Martijn van de Ven
  Scott van den Boogaard

own goals

  Alexey Chesmin
  Gholamreza Najafi
  Graeme Paterson
  Jonathan Paterson
  Jean Rodriques
  Scott Troup

Ranking

See also

References

External links 
 2009 CPISRA International Championships
 CPISRA football 7-a-side international championships 2009 match reports (PDF)
 Schedule 2009 CPISRA Football 7-a-side International Championships (PDF)
 Cerebral Palsy International Sports & Recreation Association (CPISRA)
 International Federation of Cerebral Palsy Football (IFCPF)

2009 in association football
2009
2008–09 in Dutch football
Paralympic association football
CP football